Gwala may refer to:

 Gwala (Yadav) (community), an Indian caste of cattle herdsmen
 Gwala (wasp), a wasp genus in the subfamily Encyrtinae
 Harry Gwala (1920–1995), revolutionary leader in the African National Congress
 Harry Gwala District Municipality
 Mafika Gwala (1946–2010), South African poet and editor
 Nkululeko Gwala (died 2013), supporter of the Marikana Land Occupation, in Durban, South Africa

See also
 Gwale, a Local Government Area in Kano State, Nigeria
 Gwalvanshi, a sub division of Ahir